The 1899 Vanderbilt Commodores football team represented Vanderbilt University during the 1899 Southern Intercollegiate Athletic Association football season. The Commodores were coached by James L. Crane, in his first year as head coach. Quarterback Frank Godchaux Sr., the father of Frank Godchaux, from Abbeville, Louisiana, who transferred from LSU to Vanderbilt in 1897, lettered this year in football. After football, he became a self-made business magnate of a successful rice milling company. Grantland Rice lettered at end.

Schedule

References

Vanderbilt
Vanderbilt Commodores football seasons
Vanderbilt Commodores football